The 2012–13 National League A season is the sixth ice hockey season of Switzerland's top hockey league, the National League A. Overall, it is the 75th season of Swiss professional hockey.

Regular season

GP = Games Played, W = Wins, L = Loss, OTW = Overtime win, OTL = Overtime loss, SHW = Shootout win, SHL =  Shootout lossColor code:  = Qualified for Playoffs,  = Qualified for Relegation Playoffs

Playoffs

Relegation Playoffs

The bottom 4 teams of the National League A will compete in a losing team advances tournament to determine if they should stay in the League. The loser of this tournament will compete against the champions of the National League B to determine which league they will play in next season.

Playdowns
The SCL Tigers were defeated by Lausanne HC, champions of the National League B, in the promotion/relegation games with a series of 4-2. The 12th team of the National League A for the season 2013/2014 will be Lausanne HC.

External links
Official League Website  
Official League Website  

1
Swiss
National League (ice hockey) seasons